Didectoprocnemis is a monotypic genus of  dwarf spiders containing the single species, Didectoprocnemis cirtensis. It was first described by J. Denis in 1950, and has only been found in Algeria, France, Greece, Morocco, Portugal, and Tunisia.

See also
 List of Linyphiidae species

References

Linyphiidae
Monotypic Araneomorphae genera
Spiders of Asia